Redkino is a rural locality (a village) in Markovskoye Rural Settlement, Vologodsky District, Vologda Oblast, Russia. The population was 1 as of 2002.

Geography 
Redkino is located 26 km southeast of Vologda (the district's administrative centre) by road. Chernetskoye is the nearest rural locality.

References 

Rural localities in Vologodsky District